Arizona Derby Dames (AZDD) is an all-women's amateur roller derby league based in the Phoenix, Arizona metropolitan area. The league currently plays banked-track roller derby.

AZDD was founded by four skaters, Suzy Homewrecker (XXX), Joan Threat (50), All The Way Mae (213) and Prima Donna (32). These skaters aspired for AZDD to become Arizona's first banked-track roller derby league. Suzy Homewrecker originally skated for TXRD Lonestar Rollergirls, one of the first leagues that was established of the current resurgence of roller derby, and the league featured on Rollergirls. These founding skaters were originally members of Arizona Roller Derby.

AZDD normally holds one doubleheader bout per month. Between 2006 and 2008, these bouts were held at the Castle Sports Club in Phoenix. In late 2008, the league announced that the 2009 season would be held in the Arizona Veterans Memorial Coliseum. The Castle Sports Club is still the venue for Arizona Roller Derby and Desert Dolls Roller Derby.

On March 20, 2010, AZDD played their first doubleheader at the Veteran's Memorial Coliseum using a newly designed banked track. The last known banked-track events in Arizona were in the 1960s with the Arizona Raiders of the National Skating Derby. The crowd, estimated to be over 4,000, is a record for the league and a record crowd for "resurgence era" roller derby in Arizona.

Arizona Derby Dames became a founding member of the Roller Derby Coalition of Leagues in January 2012.

Teams

The Arizona Derby Dames has six home teams:
 The Bombshells are themed after the pin-up girls of the 1940s. Teams colors are Army green and red . (team captain: Skid Vicious)
 The Brutal Beauties are the beauty queen rejects of the league, apparently inspired by Tonya Harding, the team sports pink and has the motto "pink por vida" (pink for life).  (team captain: Princess Slaya)
 The Coffin Draggers wear neon green and black colors on their uniforms. Some team members will wear face make-up and much fake blood. They are dubbed "the prettiest girls in the morgue".  (team captain: The Panda Face Killer)
 The Doomsday Valkyries are the league's 2016 expansion team. Team colors orange and silver. Some team members will wear face make-up. They are "post-apocalyptic warrior women on skates".  (team captain: Hot N Ready)
 The Schoolyard Scrappers are the league's 2007 expansion team.  Team colors Royal blue and yellow and wear plaid, these "good girls gone bad" reminiscent of the private school bully.  (team captain: Nikki BadAzz)
 The Runaway Brides was the league's 2008 expansion team.  This team was inspired by the story of Jennifer Wilbanks.  Team colors: White and Maroon.  (team captain: Ellie Mayhem)

"Fresh Meat"
AZDD recruits members through tryouts that are held about every few months. Those new recruits who pass the tryouts start attending required practices and will eventually need to pass a skills test and a scrimmage test before being drafted to a team. While waiting for placement on a team, the "fresh meat" skaters perform other tasks at the bout such as the sale of raffle tickets, talking to fans, and cleanup duties throughout bout nights. "Fresh Meat" is a common term used in roller derby to define a skater who is still in training.

References

External links
 Arizona Derby Dames official website

Sports in Phoenix, Arizona
Roller derby leagues established in 2005
Roller derby leagues in Arizona
Roller Derby Coalition of Leagues
2005 establishments in Arizona